Grand Valley North Aerodrome  is located  north northwest of Grand Valley, Ontario, Canada.

See also
Grand Valley/Luther Field Aerodrome
Grand Valley (Madill Field) Aerodrome
Grand Valley (Martin Field) Aerodrome
Grand Valley (Black Field) Aerodrome

References

Registered aerodromes in Ontario